Roura is a surname.

People with this name
 Eudald Carbonell Roura (born 1953), Spanish archaeologist, anthropologist and paleontologist
 Gisela Riera Roura (born 1976), retired Spanish tennis player
 Jordi Roura (born 1967), Spanish football player
 Jorge Roura (born 1946), Spanish luger
 Oxaï Roura, French musician
 Sergio Roura (born 1972), Spanish swimmer
 Teresa Jordà i Roura (born 1972), Catalan politician
 Trinidad Roura, maiden name of Trinidad Roxas (1899–1995), Philippine first lady

See also
 Roura, French Guiana